Ronald Ophuis (born 1968 in Hengelo, Netherlands), is a Dutch artist. His paintings, presenting acts of physical, sexual and psychological violence, have raised high emotional responses and controversies.

Biography

Ophuis lives and works in Amsterdam, The Netherlands. He studied at the Gerrit Rietveld Academie in Amsterdam (1988–1990) and the AKI Academy for Arts and Industrial Design in Enschede (1990–1993). Ophuis often travels to take pictures and to find inspiration for his paintings. In 2003, Ophuis traveled to Srebrenica, where he talked with local people about their situation. The photographs that he took served as inspiration for several paintings. In 2010, he traveled with a camera crew to Sierra Leone, where he interviewed and photographed child soldiers. This resulted in a series of portraits of child soldiers.

Work
Representations of pain, suffering, and violence, such as the crucifixions, descents from the cross, and other biblical scenes have always played a central role in the history of Western Art. The work of Ronald Ophuis can be placed in this Western tradition of painting, but is different in that Ophuis’ scenes take place in our own world, instead of an abstracted, mythical context. In one of his best-known works, Football players I (1996), three young footballers force a teammate to the changing room floor a sodomize him with a Coca-Cola bottle. The recognizable motifs such as the changing room, the Coca-Cola bottle, and the football clothing make this scene highly familiar to the viewer. Other works are Sweet Violence (1996), Birkenau I (2002), Birkenau II (2003), and Execution (1995). Those paintings are representing sexual violence or are loaded with sexual tension. Other paintings showing scenes of perpetrating violence can be understood as part of war situations. For example, the Srebrenica series (2004–2008).

A second difference is that many of Ophuis’ works focus predominantly on the perpetrator, while in biblical scenes the central figures are victims of violence. In these scenes, the viewer can identify with the victim. The scenes are part of a narrative in which the role of the perpetrator and the victim are fixed. The suffering victim is without guilt and, therefore, posits his viewers also without guilt. In Ophuis’ works, the viewer's attention is mainly directed to the perpetrators. One is encouraged to imagine oneself in a situation or position one does not want to be in. Often, it is not clear whether the paintings celebrate or condemn the violence, which prompts the viewer to first consider his or her own moral position.

Historical and contemporary examples

Ophuis’ paintings can be related to the tradition of history painting in which he follows the Realistic mode. His works shows similarities with works by realistic history painters such as Édouard Manet. Like in Manet's painting The Execution of Emperor Maximilian (1867), the Ophuis’ paintings show a single moment in a most neutral way. Rather than the victim, the perpetrator is in the centre of the scene. Also, there are no clues of a pre-history, or of a closure. There is no dramatic lightning that suggests an unfolding of time. In short there are no metaphysical and moral dimensions which are so predominant in a biblical scene.

His large works from the last few years demonstrate how he has primarily looked to the nineteenth century for references; to the likes of Goya, Géricault, Delacroix, Courbet and Manet (a tradition continued in the 20th century by Picasso, Golub and Richter, with Jeff Wall as the contemporary exponent).

In present time Ophuis’ paintings can be compared to David Fincher’s film Fight Club (1999). Just like the paintings the film gives no answer whether it condemns or celebrates the violence it shows. The film and the paintings get therefore the same critique. The viewer expects a representation to be a sequence of events, or a source of information. In relation to the majority of mass media representations, Ophuis is as exceptional as Fincher. Ophuis is not performing a representational practice in which the viewer is directed in how to process or digest the representation, especially when it concerns issues of violence. Ophuis does not give a direction in his paintings and the viewer is compelled to make his own moral judgement.

Usually, Ophuis first stages the scenes with actors and takes pictures of the enacted scenes. Ultimately, he transforms the photographs into pictures. Ophuis uses a technique of covering the canvas with paint and after a process of scraping away and building up paint, leaves underlying layers filtering through the upper surface. Ophuis usually presents the violence in a highly direct and confrontational manner.

Museums and institutions
Ronald Ophuis' work has been on show at:

 Centraal Museum, Utrecht
 Museum der bildenden Künste, Leipzig
 GEMAK, The Hague
 Zoya Museum, Slovakia
 Museum Jan Cunen, Oss
 Kunsthal, Rotterdam
 Stedelijk Museum, Schiedam
 Museum De Vleeshal, Haarlem
 Stedelijk Museum Amsterdam
 Stedelijk Museum Bureau Amsterdam
 De Appel, Amsterdam
 Gemeentemuseum Den Haag The Hague
 Kunstraum Innsbruck

Awards
2004 Jeanne Oostingprijs
2002 Nomination Wolvecamp prijs
1998 Charlotte Köhlerprijs
1997 Kunstprijs Provincie Overijssel

References
 Article on Ronald Ophuis in Metropolis M (2009)
 Article SMBA Project Space of the Stedelijk Museum Amsterdam
 Van Alphen, E., 2008, Ronald Ophuis, JRP|RINGIER Kunstverlag AG Zürich

External links
Website about the Documentary Painful Painting
Exhibition Painful Painting in Museum Jan Cunen, Oss (2009)
Upstream Gallery representing Ronald Ophuis
Galeries.nl
Bernard Ceysson Gallery Luxembourg representing Ronald Ophuis in Luxembourg

1968 births
Living people
Dutch painters
Dutch male painters
Painters from Amsterdam